7α-Methylestradiol (7α-Me-E2), also known as 7α-methylestra-1,3,5(10)-triene-3,17β-diol, is a synthetic estrogen and an active metabolite of the androgen/anabolic steroid trestolone. It is considered to be responsible for the estrogenic activity of trestolone. The compound shows about the same affinity for the estrogen receptor as estradiol.

See also
 List of estrogens
 Methylestradiol
 Ethylestradiol
 Ethinylestradiol
 Almestrone

References

Abandoned drugs
Secondary alcohols
Estranes
Human drug metabolites
Synthetic estrogens